Olga Mukomol (also Olha, born 30 March 1979) is a retired Ukrainian swimmer who won three medals at the LEN European Aquatics Championships of 2000–2004. She also competed at the 2000 and 2004 Summer Olympics in three events each, but was eliminated in the preliminaries.

In 2004, she set a national record in the 50 m freestyle that stood for five years.

References

External links
 

1979 births
Living people
Ukrainian female swimmers
Olympic swimmers of Ukraine
Swimmers at the 2000 Summer Olympics
Swimmers at the 2004 Summer Olympics
Ukrainian female freestyle swimmers
European Aquatics Championships medalists in swimming
Universiade medalists in swimming
Universiade gold medalists for Ukraine
Medalists at the 2001 Summer Universiade
Medalists at the 2003 Summer Universiade
People from Bila Tserkva
Sportspeople from Kyiv Oblast
21st-century Ukrainian women